Life with Billy is a 1994 Canadian television film based on the non-fiction book of the same name by Brian Vallée. The film was nominated for five Gemini Awards, and won three.

The film begins with Jane Hurshman (Beatty) shooting her common-law husband Billy Stafford (McHattie) in his sleep, and then shows the resulting police investigation and trial, interspersed with flashbacks showing the domestic abuse that Stafford inflicted on Hurshman over the course of their relationship.

Cast
 Nancy Beatty as Jane Hurshman
 Stephen McHattie as Billy Stafford
 Deb Allen as Mandy
 Glenn Wadman as Ronnie Wamboldt
 Matthew Ferguson as Allan Whynot
 Joadi Newcomb as Dini Harrison
 Nancy Marshall as Bernice Wamboldt
 Tony Quinn as Cpl. Lawson
 Richard Donat as Constable Snow

Awards

Won 
 Gemini Award for Best Direction in a Dramatic Program or Mini-Series - Paul Donovan
 Gemini Award for Best Performance by an Actor in a Leading Role in a Dramatic Program or Mini-Series - Stephen McHattie
 Gemini Award for Best Performance by an Actress in a Leading Role in a Dramatic Program or Mini-Series - Nancy Beatty

Nominations 
 Gemini Award for Best TV Movie - Eric Jordan & Michael Donovan
 Gemini Award for Best Writing in a Dramatic Program or Mini-Series - John Frizzell & Judith Thompson

Read also

External links

 
Book author profile
 Official Website of Brian Vallee
 Life with Billy series in the Brian Vallée archival fonds

English-language Canadian films
Canadian television films
1994 drama films
Films set in Nova Scotia
Films shot in Nova Scotia
Films based on non-fiction books
Films about domestic violence
Canadian Screen Award-winning television shows
1994 television films
1994 films
Films directed by Paul Donovan
1990s Canadian films